is a Japanese footballer currently playing as a defender for Matsumoto Yamaga.

Career statistics

Club
.

Notes

References

External links

1998 births
Living people
Ryutsu Keizai University alumni
Japanese footballers
Association football midfielders
Japan Football League players
J2 League players
Matsumoto Yamaga FC players